William Wells may refer to:

Military
 William Wells (general) (1837–1892), U.S. Army officer and Medal of Honor recipient for the Battle of Gettysburg
 William Wells (Medal of Honor) (1832–?), American Civil War sailor and Medal of Honor recipient
 William Wells (soldier) (1770–1812), American army officer and adopted member of the Miami tribe
 William Lewis Wells (1895–1918), World War I flying ace

Sports
 Billy Wells (American football) (William Prescott Wells, 1931–2001), American professional football player
 Bombardier Billy Wells (William Thomas Wells, 1889–1967), English heavyweight boxer
 William Wells (boxer) (born 1936), British Olympic boxer
 Willie Wells (1906–1989), American professional baseball player
 Willie Wells Jr. (1922–1994), American professional baseball player
 Bill Wells (footballer) (1920–2013), Australian rules footballer
 Billy Wells (footballer) (1916–1984), Australian rules footballer

Music
 Bill Wells (born c. 1963), Scottish musician
 Dicky Wells (William Wells, 1907–1985), American jazz trombonist

Politics
 William Benjamin Wells (1809–1881), Canadian lawyer, judge, journalist and politician
 William H. Wells (1769–1829), American lawyer and U.S. Senator from Delaware
 William S. Wells (1848–1916), member of the Maine House of Representatives
 William Wells (1908–1990), barrister, MP for Walsall North from 1945–74
 William Wells (New Zealand politician) (1810–1893), member of New Zealand Parliament
 William Wells (1818–1889), British Liberal Member of Parliament (MP) for Beverley, 1852–1857, and Peterborough, 1874–1874

Other fields
 William Wells (bishop) (died 1444), English Roman Catholic Bishop of Rochester
 William Wells (priest) (died 1675), English Church of England Archdeacon of Colchester
 William Wells (minister) (1744–1827), minister & farmer of Bromsgrove, Worcestershire (UK); and Brattleboro, VT
 William Charles Wells (1757–1817), Scottish-American physician and printer
 William F. Wells (1886-1963), American scientist and sanitary engineer
 William Frederick Wells (1762–1836), English watercolour painter and etcher
 William H. Wells (educator) (1812–1865), educator who served as superintendent of Chicago Public Schools
 William Wells (whaling master) (1815–1880), English captain of whaling ships
 William George Wells, Chief Scout Commissioner of Scouts Australia
 William Wells (cricketer) (1881–1939), English cricketer
 William Storrs Wells (1849–1926), American businessman, prominent in New York society during the Gilded Age

See also
 Welles (name)
 Wells (name)